The 1956 Sydney to Hobart Yacht Race, was the 12th annual running of the "blue water classic" Sydney to Hobart Yacht Race.

Hosted by the Cruising Yacht Club of Australia based in Sydney, New South Wales, the 1956 edition began on Sydney Harbour, at noon on Boxing Day (26 December 1955), before heading south for 630 nautical miles (1,170 km) through the Tasman Sea, past Bass Strait, into Storm Bay and up the River Derwent, to cross the finish line in Hobart, Tasmania.

The 1956 Sydney to Hobart Yacht Race comprised a fleet of 28 competitors, an increase of 11 yachts compared to the number in the 1955 race. Line-honours were awarded to Kurrewa IV, which raced out of New South Wales and was owned and skippered by brother's J. & F. Livingston.

1956 fleet
28 yachts registered to begin the 1953 Sydney to Hobart Yacht race. They are:

Results

References

See also
Sydney to Hobart Yacht Race

Sydney to Hobart Yacht Race
S
1956 in Australian sport
December 1956 sports events in Australia
January 1957 sports events in Australia